Woodbury Common may refer to:

 Woodbury Common, Devon, an area of common land near Woodbury, Devon, England
 Woodbury Common Premium Outlets, an outlet center near Central Valley, New York, United States